Brasiliano orogeny or Brasiliano cycle ( and Ciclo Brasiliano) refers to a series of orogenies of Neoproterozoic age exposed chiefly in Brazil but also in other parts of South America. The Brasiliano orogeny is a regional name for the larger Pan-African/Brasiliano orogeny that extended not only in South America but across most of Gondwana. In a wide sense the Brasiliano orogeny includes also the Pampean orogeny. Almeida et al. coined the term Brasiliano Orogenic Cycle in 1973. The orogeny led to the closure of several oceans and aulacogens including the Adamastor Ocean, the Goianides Ocean, the Puncoviscana Ocean and the Peri-Franciscano Ocean.

Attempts to correlate the South American Brasiliano belts with the African Pan-African belts on the other side of the Atlantic has in many cases been problematic.

Belts and belt provinces

See also
 Trans Brazilian Lineament

Notes

References

Orogenies of South America
Cryogenian orogenies
Ediacaran orogenies
Ediacaran South America
Geology of Argentina
Geology of Brazil
Geology of Paraguay
Geology of Uruguay
Neoproterozoic orogenies
Neoproterozoic South America
Precambrian South America